Elachista cornuta is a moth in the family Elachistidae. It was described by Parenti in 1981. It is found in Iran.

References

Moths described in 1981
cornuta
Moths of Asia